Laccoporus is a genus of beetles in the family Dytiscidae, containing the following species:

 Laccoporus nigritulus (Gschwendtner, 1936)
 Laccoporus viator J.Balfour-Browne, 1939

References

Dytiscidae